Edward James Hamilton (October 8, 1880 – ?) was a college football, basketball, and baseball player and coach as well as an attorney. He attended preparatory school at Mooney School in Franklin, Tennessee along with Red Smith and Frank Kyle. Hamilton was born in Enid, Mississippi.

Hamilton was an All-Southern end for the first years of Dan McGugin's Vanderbilt Commodores football teams. He was an All-Southern second baseman on the baseball team. Hamilton coached the Vanderbilt basketball squad in 1903–1904 and 1908–09 for a combined record of 17–5.

Hamilton was the first to meet McGugin in Nashville, and has his law office next to his. Hamilton won Bachelor of Ugliness. He married Theresa Henderson, the daughter of judge John Henderson.

References

American football ends
Vanderbilt Commodores men's basketball coaches
Vanderbilt Commodores football players
All-Southern college football players
Vanderbilt Commodores baseball coaches
Vanderbilt Commodores baseball players
Baseball second basemen
Basketball coaches from Mississippi
Players of American football from Mississippi
1880 births
Year of death missing